Preston Gothard is a former professional American football player who played tight end for five seasons for the Pittsburgh Steelers.

References

1962 births
American football tight ends
American football wide receivers
Pittsburgh Steelers players
Alabama Crimson Tide football players
Living people
Players of American football from Montgomery, Alabama